Marques Batista de Abreu (born February 12, 1973), or simply Marques, is a former Brazilian striker. In 2003, when Marques was playing for Nagoya Grampus Eight he was ranked 2nd highest assists in J1 League as he had 10 assists and was beaten by Yukihiko Sato who had 12 assists during that season. Marques also had a great partnership with fellow Brazilian, Ueslei who topped the goal scoring in 2003 J1 League season.

It has been reported that Marques plans to retire from football in 2010 and run for political office for the Brazilian Labour Party.

Career statistics

Club
Source:

International

Performances for National Team
Last update: 10 Jan 2007

Honours

Club
Corinthians
 Campeonato Paulista: 1995
 Copa do Brasil: 1995

Flamengo
 Campeonato Carioca: 1996
 Copa de Oro: 1996

Atlético Mineiro
 Copa Conmebol: 1997
 Campeonato Mineiro: 1999, 2000, 2010

Vasco da Gama
 Campeonato Carioca: 2003

Individual
J1 League Best eleven: 2004
Minas Gerais state league's top scorer: 1998
Brazilian Bola de Prata (Placar): 1999, 2001

References

External links
 CBF  
 

 
 globoesporte 
  

1973 births
Living people
Association football forwards
Brazilian footballers
People from Guarulhos
Brazilian expatriate footballers
Sport Club Corinthians Paulista players
CR Flamengo footballers
São Paulo FC players
Clube Atlético Mineiro players
CR Vasco da Gama players
Nagoya Grampus players
Yokohama F. Marinos players
Campeonato Brasileiro Série A players
J1 League players
Expatriate footballers in Japan
Brazil international footballers
Footballers from São Paulo (state)